The 2006–07 Atlanta Thrashers season began with the highest expectations in franchise history, even with the off-season loss of their second-leading scorer, Marc Savard, to the Boston Bruins. Veteran centers Steve Rucchin, Niko Kapanen and Jon Sim were acquired in hopes help fill the loss of Savard. With NHL superstars Marian Hossa and Ilya Kovalchuk and a healthy goaltender, Kari Lehtonen, the Thrashers clinched the first playoff berth in franchise history following the Toronto Maple Leafs' 7–2 loss to the New York Rangers on April 1. The Thrashers had a highly disappointing playoff series against the New York Rangers, as they were upset in a 4-game sweep with losses of 4–3, 2–1, 7–0, and 4–2.

Regular season

Season standings

Schedule and results

October

Record for month 8–2–3 (Home 4–1–1  Away 4–1–2)

November

Record for Month 8–5–1 (Home 4–3–0 Away  4–2–1)

December

Record for Month 7–4–2 (Home 3–1–2 Away 4–3–0)

January

Record for month 6–5–2 (Home 3–2–1  Away 3–3–1)

February

Record for month 3–7–2 (Home 0–3–2  Away 3–4–0)

March

Record for month 9–4–1 (Home 8–1–0  Away 1–3–1)

April

Record for month 2–1–0 (Home 1–1–0  Away 1–0–0)

Playoffs 
The Thrashers qualified for the post-season for the first time in franchise history, while also capturing their first Southeast Division championship.  Atlanta headed into the playoffs as the 3rd seed in the Eastern Conference.  They were eliminated from the playoffs on April 18, being swept by the New York Rangers in four straight games in the Quarter-finals.

Eastern Conference Quarter-finals: versus NY Rangers (6)
New York Rangers win series 4–0

Player stats

Regular season
Scoring

Goaltending

Playoffs
Scoring

Goaltending

Transactions

Trades

Free agents acquired

Free agents lost

Waiver losses

Draft picks
Atlanta's picks at the 2006 NHL Entry Draft in Vancouver, British Columbia.  The Atlanta had the 12th overall draft pick in the 2005–06 NHL season.

External links
Official site of the Atlanta Thrashers

See also
2006–07 NHL Season

References

Game log: Atlanta Thrashers game log on espn.com
Team standings: NHL standings on espn.com
Player Stats: Atlanta Thrashers 2006-07 Reg. Season Stats on espn.com
Draft Picks: 2006 NHL Entry Draft

 

Atlanta
Atlanta
Atlanta Thrashers seasons
Atlanta Thrashers
Atlanta Thrashers